Deh Sorkh (also Romanized as Deh Sork) is a village in Sarjam Rural District, Ahmadabad District, Mashhad County, Razavi Khorasan Province, Iran. At the 2006 census, its population was 570, in 162 families.

References 

Populated places in Mashhad County